The Mayor of Siena is an elected politician who, along with the Siena's City Council, is accountable for the strategic government of Siena in Tuscany, Italy.

The current Mayor is Luigi De Mossi, a centre-right independent, who took office on 25 June 2018.

Overview
According to the Italian Constitution, the Mayor of Siena is member of the City Council.

The Mayor is elected by the population of Siena, who also elects the members of the City Council, controlling the Mayor's policy guidelines and is able to enforce his resignation by a motion of no confidence. The Mayor is entitled to appoint and release the members of his government.

Since 1993 the Mayor is elected directly by Siena's electorate: in all mayoral elections in Italy in cities with a population higher than 15,000 the voters express a direct choice for the mayor or an indirect choice voting for the party of the candidate's coalition. If no candidate receives at least 50% of votes, the top two candidates go to a second round after two weeks. The election of the City Council is based on a direct choice for the candidate with a preference vote: the candidate with the majority of the preferences is elected. The number of the seats for each party is determined proportionally.

Kingdom of Italy (1861–1946)
In 1865, the Kingdom of Italy created the office of Mayor of Siena (Sindaco di Siena), appointed by the King himself. From 1892 to 1926 the Mayor was elected by the City council. In 1926, the Fascist dictatorship abolished mayors and City councils, replacing them with an authoritarian Podestà chosen by the National Fascist Party. The office of Mayor was restored in 1944 during the Allied occupation.

Timeline

Republic of Italy (since 1946)

City Council election (1946–1993)
From 1946 to 1993 the Mayor of Siena was elected by the City Council.

Notes

Direct election (since 1993)
Since 1993, enacting a new law on local administrations, the Mayor of Siena is chosen by direct election, originally every four, and since 2001 every five years.

Notes

Timeline

See also
 Timeline of Siena

References

Bibliography

External links
 

Siena
 
Politics of Tuscany
Siena